China Daily News can refer to:

Chinese Hand Laundry Alliance#China Daily News and the Red Scare, a newspaper founded in 1940 by the Chinese Hand Laundry Alliance
China Daily News (Taiwan), a contemporary newspaper published in Taiwan, Republic of China

See also 
China Daily, an English-language daily newspaper published in the People's Republic of China
 Chinese Daily News (disambiguation)